The 1980–81 Washington State Cougars men's basketball team represented Washington State University for the 1980–81 NCAA Division I men's basketball season. Led by tenth-year head coach George Raveling, the Cougars were members of the Pacific-10 Conference and played their home games on campus at Beasley Coliseum in Pullman, Washington.

There was no conference tournament yet, which debuted six years later. The previous season, WSU made the 48-team NCAA tournament and finished at 22–6, among the best records in school history.

This was the Cougars' first losing season in six years, since 1974–75.

References

External links
Sports Reference – Washington State Cougars: 1980–81 basketball season

Washington State Cougars men's basketball seasons
Washington State Cougars
Washington State
Washington State